Aquashow Deconstructed was the re-recording by singer-songwriter Elliott Murphy of the ten songs off his 1973 album Aquashow in a Paris studio, produced, arranged and mixed by his son Gaspard Murphy who had previously produced French pop band Superbus.

Track listing
All tracks composed by Elliott Murphy

"Last of The Rock Stars"
"How's The Family"
"Hangin' Out"
"Hometown"
"Graveyard Scrapbook"
"Poise 'N Pen"
"Marilyn"
"White Middle Class Blues"
"Like a Great Gatsby"
"Don't Go Away"

Personnel
Elliott Murphy – vocals, guitar, harmonica, keyboards
Tom Daveau – drums
Olivier Durand – guitar
Gaspard Murphy – guitar, bass, keyboards, background vocals
Thomas Roussel – violin
David Gaugué – Cello

References

2015 albums
Elliott Murphy albums